Gregory Kaidanov (born 11 October 1959) is a Soviet-born American chess grandmaster. He was inducted into the United States Chess Hall of Fame in 2013. His peak rating is 2646, achieved in 2002.

Biography and chess career
Kaidanov is the head coach of the United States Chess School and teaches at the grandmaster level.

Career highlights
 1972 – Boys under-14 Russian Federation Championship – 1st place
 1975 – achieved Candidate of Master (analog of expert in US)
 1978 – achieved Master 
 1987 – achieved International Master 
 1988 – achieved Grandmaster
 1992 – won World Open Chess Championship
 1992 – won US Open Chess Championship
 1993 – won World Team Chess Championship as a member of US team
 1998 – silver medal in 1998 Chess Olympiad as a member of US team
 2001 – won North American Open Chess Championship
 2002 – won Aeroflot Open (over 81 other grandmasters)
 2008 – won the Gausdal Classic, held 8–16 April in Gausdal, Norway, scoring 7/9
 2021 – won the US championship for senior players

Notable games
Gregory Kaidanov vs. Viswanathan Anand, Moscow 1987, Caro–Kann Defense: Panov Attack (B13), 1–0
Gregory Kaidanov vs. Evgeny Bareev, Ch URS (1 liga) 1987, Vienna Game: Stanley, Frankenstein–Dracula Variation (C27), 1–0
Mark Taimanov vs. Gregory Kaidanov, Belgrade 1988, English Opening: Agincourt Defense, Wimpey System (A13), 0–1
Benjamin Finegold vs. Gregory Kaidanov, 12th Chicago Open 2003, Semi-Slav Defense: Stoltz Variation (D45), 0–1

See also
 List of Jewish chess players

References

External links

"GM Gregory Kaidanov" biography at USChess.org

1959 births
Living people
People from Berdychiv
Chess grandmasters
Chess Olympiad competitors
Chess coaches
Ukrainian Jews
American people of Ukrainian-Jewish descent
American chess players
Russian chess players
Ukrainian chess players
Soviet chess players
Jewish chess players
People from Kaliningrad